Elian Marjieh (known by her stage name Elyanna) is a Palestinian-Chilean singer and songwriter. She has released two EPs: Elyanna (2020) and Elyanna II (2022). She is currently signed to Universal Arabic Music. Her singles Ana Lahale, Ghareeb Alay, and Ala Bali have all charted on The Official Lebanese Top 20.

Early life

Elian Marjieh was born and raised in Nazareth, Israel and is of Palestinian and Chilean descent. Her mother is a poet, and her grandfather is a poet and singer. She began singing at age seven and started posting covers of songs on SoundCloud as a teenager. In 2017, at age 15, she and her family moved to San Diego, California (eventually settling in Los Angeles) to further pursue her musical career. After arriving in the United States, she began posting covers on her Instagram, where she garnered a following of around 300,000 users.

Career

In 2018, Elyanna contacted singer and producer, Nasri, who took an interest and connected her to his manager, Wassim Slaiby. She was signed to Slaiby's management company, SALXCO, soon after the two met. She was then mentored by Nasri and fellow singer and producer, Massari. One of her first singles, "Ana Lahale," featured guest vocals from Massari. That track was on her debut self-titled EP released in February 2020 via ElMar Music, an Empire Distribution imprint. In April 2021, Elyanna was announced as one of the first signees of the newly-formed imprint, Universal Arabic Music (UAM), which was founded by Slaiby in collaboration with Republic Records and the Universal Music Group.

In 2021, she would perform alongside Alnajjar at his concert in Amman, Jordan the following month. In January 2022, she collaborated with Tunisian artist, Balti, on the track "Ghareeb Alay." In March 2022, she released her second EP, Elyanna II, via UAM. The collection features the single "Al Kawn Janni Maak" (an Arabic version of "La Vie en rose"). The music video for the song was styled by Lana Del Rey and directed by her sister, Caroline "Chuck" Grant.

Discography

EPs

Singles

References

External links
Elyanna on Instagram

2002 births
Living people
Palestinian emigrants to the United States
Palestinian people of Chilean descent
Palestinian singers
Singers from Los Angeles
Chilean singer-songwriters
Universal Music Group artists